Gimme Some Truth: The Ultimate Mixes (stylized in all caps) is a compilation album of music recorded by John Lennon over the course of his solo career, each song remixed from new transfers of the original tracks. It was released on 9 October 2020, on what would have been Lennon's 80th birthday. The set was executive produced by Yoko Ono and produced by Sean Lennon.

Background 
Gimme Some Truth. The Ultimate Mixes was produced by the team consisting of production manager Simon Hilton, mixer, engineer, and producer Paul Hicks, and mix engineer and producer Sam Gannon—with direction from Yoko Ono and Sean Ono Lennon as the producer and creative director, respectively. The majority of the original tapes from the vault at Abbey Road and New York were digitised at Henson Studios in Los Angeles.

The track selection of the two-disc edition is similar to the earlier compilation Working Class Hero: The Definitive Lennon, with the tracks "How Do You Sleep?", "Angela", "I Know (I Know)", "Steel and Glass", "Angel Baby", "Dear Yoko" and "Every Man Has a Woman Who Loves Him" replacing "Mother", "Woman is the Nigger of the World", "New York City", "You Are Here", "Intuition", "Scared", "Nobody Loves You (When You're Down and Out)", "Borrowed Time" and "Real Love". It also organises the tracks in largely chronological order, better reflecting the progression of Lennon's post-Beatles career.

Artwork and packaging
The cover art and supplemental materials were designed by Jonathan Barnbrook. The cover features a profile black and white photo of Lennon, taken the day he returned his MBE.

The versions of the album include a 19-track version (1 CD, or 2LPs), a 36-track version (2 CDs or 4 LPs), and additional 2 CDs + Blu-Ray with a 124-page book.

Track listing
All songs were written by John Lennon, except where noted.

36-track version

Disc 1

Disc 2

19-track version

Blu-Ray Audio Disc
All thirty-six tracks in High Definition audio repeated as:
 HD Stereo Audio Mixes (24-bit/96 kHz)
 HD 5.1 Surround Sound Mixes (24-bit/96 kHz)
 HD Dolby Atmos Mixes

Charts

Certifications

References

2020 compilation albums
Capitol Records compilation albums
Compilation albums published posthumously
EMI Records compilation albums
John Lennon compilation albums